Peter Reichhardt (born 7 January 1967) is a Danish actor and theatre director. He is the son of actors Poul Reichhardt and Charlotte Ernst. He was the director of the Mungo Park in Lillerød from 1998–2005.

Selected filmography

References

External links 

1967 births
Living people
Danish male film actors
Danish male stage actors